In computational statistics, the Metropolis-adjusted Langevin algorithm (MALA) or Langevin Monte Carlo (LMC) is a Markov chain Monte Carlo (MCMC) method for obtaining random samples – sequences of random observations – from a probability distribution for which direct sampling is difficult.  As the name suggests, MALA uses a combination of two mechanisms to generate the states of a random walk that has the target probability distribution as an invariant measure:
 new states are proposed using (overdamped) Langevin dynamics, which use evaluations of the gradient of the target probability density function;
 these proposals are accepted or rejected using the Metropolis–Hastings algorithm, which uses evaluations of the target probability density (but not its gradient).
Informally, the Langevin dynamics drive the random walk towards regions of high probability in the manner of a gradient flow, while the Metropolis–Hastings accept/reject mechanism improves the mixing and convergence properties of this random walk.  MALA was originally proposed by Julian Besag in 1994, (although the method Smart Monte Carlo was already introduced in 1978 ) and its properties were examined in detail by  Gareth Roberts together with Richard Tweedie and Jeff Rosenthal.  Many variations and refinements have been introduced since then, e.g. the manifold variant of Girolami and Calderhead (2011). The method is equivalent to using the Hamiltonian Monte Carlo (hybrid Monte Carlo) algorithm with only a single discrete time step.

Further details

We consider the overdamped Langevin  Itô diffusion

 

driven by the time derivative of a standard Brownian motion .  (Note that another commonly-used normalization for this diffusion is

 

which generates the same dynamics.) It turns out that, in fact, .

Approximate sample paths of the Langevin diffusion can be generated by many discrete-time methods.  One of the simplest is the Euler–Maruyama method with a fixed time step .  We set  and then recursively define an approximation  to the true solution  by

Note that  is normally distributed with mean  and covariance equal to  times the  identity matrix.

In contrast to the Euler–Maruyama method for simulating the Langevin diffusion, which always updates  according to the update rule

MALA incorporates an additional step.  We consider the above update rule as defining a proposal  for a new state,

This proposal is accepted or rejected according to the Metropolis-Hastings algorithm:  set

where

Let  be drawn from the continuous uniform distribution on the interval . If , then the proposal is accepted, and we set ;  otherwise, the proposal is rejected, and we set .

The combined dynamics of the Langevin diffusion and the Metropolis–Hastings algorithm satisfy the detailed balance conditions necessary for the existence of a unique, invariant, stationary distribution .  Compared to naive Metropolis–Hastings, MALA has the advantage that it usually proposes moves into regions of higher  probability, which are then more likely to be accepted.  On the other hand, when  is strongly anisotropic (i.e. it varies much more quickly in some directions than others), it is necessary to take  in order to properly capture the Langevin dynamics;  the use of a positive-definite preconditioning matrix  can help to alleviate this problem, by generating proposals according to

so that  has mean  and covariance .

For limited classes of target distributions, the optimal acceptance rate for this algorithm can be shown to be ; if it is discovered to be substantially different in practice,  should be modified accordingly.

References

Monte Carlo methods
Markov chain Monte Carlo
Sampling techniques